

Arthropoda

Newly named insects

Archosauromorphs

Newly named basal archosauromorphs

Newly named dinosaurs
Data courtesy of George Olshevsky's dinosaur genera list.

Synapsids

Non-mammalian

References